Samuel/Sam Thompson/Thomson/Thomsen may refer to:

Sports
Sam Thompson (1860–1922), Major League Baseball player
Sam Thompson (catcher) (1885–?), Negro league baseball player
Sam Thompson (pitcher) (1908–1978), Negro league baseball player
Sammy Thomson (1862–1943), Scottish footballer
Sam Thomson (sportsman), Scottish football and cricket player
Sam Thomson (rugby union) (born 1994), Scottish rugby union player
Samuel Huston Thompson (1875–1966), American football player
Samuel Thompson (footballer), Ghanaian footballer in the 2001 FIFA World Youth Championship squads
Sam Thompson (rugby league) (born 1986), English rugby league player
Sam Thompson (basketball) (born 1992), American basketball player
Sam Thompson (tennis) (born 1993), Australian tennis player

Politics
Samuel Thompson (Canadian politician) (1845–1909), veterinarian and politician in Manitoba, Canada
Samuel S. Thompson, California politician in Los Angeles
Samuel B. Thomsen (born 1931), American diplomat
Samuel Benjamin Thompson (1837–1909), politician in South Carolina
Samuel D. Thompson (born 1935), member of the New Jersey Senate

Other
Sam Thompson (TV personality)
Samuel Martin Thompson (1901–1983), American philosopher 
Brigadier Samuel Thompson (1735–1798), American Revolutionary War soldier
Samuel Thomson (1769–1843), practician of alternative medicine
Samuel Thompson (newspaper editor) (1810–1886), Canadian businessman and newspaper editor
Samuel Eaton Thompson (1875?–1960?), American contactee who claimed to have been in contact with extraterrestrials
Samuel Frederick Henry Thompson (1890–1918), British World War I flying ace
Sam Thompson (playwright) (1916–1965), Irish playwright
Samuel James Thomson (1922–2006), Scottish chemist
Sammy Thompson (1930s–1988), British trade union leader
Sam Thompson (writer) (born 1978), British novelist
Sam Thompson, the plaintiff in the 1960 U.S. Supreme court case of Thompson v. City of Louisville
Sam Thomson, musician with the band Drax Project
Samuel Thompson (herald)